The WEY VV7 is a mid-size luxury crossover SUV produced by Great Wall Motor under the premium brand, WEY. The WEY VV7 was launched on the Chinese auto market in April 2017.

Overview
The VV7, formerly known as the 01 in development phase, is the first product of Great Wall Motor’s brand, WEY. The VV7 was based on the same architecture that underpins the WEY VV5 and Haval H6 crossovers. The design of the VV7 was first previewed by the Haval Coupe Concept.

The VV7 comes with two trim levels: an entry level model named VV7 C and a sportier model named the VV7 S.

The WEY VV7 is powered by a 2.0 liter turbo engine code named GW4E20CB, with a maximum output of 227hp/5500rpm and a torque of 387N·m/1800-3600rpm mated to a 7-speed dual-clutch transmission.

WEY VV7 GT
The WEY VV7 GT is the fastback version of the WEY VV7, and shares all the components before the C-pillars. Different from the regular VV7, the VV7 GT also features a launch control system only available on the VV7 GT.

WEY VV7 GT Brabus
Brabus designed and tuned version of the WEY VV7 GT. This variant includes flared fenders, black 21-inch wheels, red brake calipers, modified front and rear bumpers, a black rear diffuser, an F1-style rear brake light, tinted windows, clear taillights and an enlarged rear deck lid spoiler.

References

VV7
Mid-size sport utility vehicles
Plug-in hybrid vehicles
Partial zero-emissions vehicles
Front-wheel-drive vehicles
All-wheel-drive vehicles
Cars introduced in 2017
Cars of China